In Ohio, State Route 270 may refer to:
Interstate 270 in Ohio, the only Ohio highway numbered 270 since about 1962
Ohio State Route 270 (1928-1962), a short route near Perrysburg